List of the National Register of Historic Places listings in Chemung County, New York

This is intended to be a complete list of properties and districts listed on the National Register of Historic Places in Chemung County, New York.  The locations of National Register properties and districts (at least for all showing latitude and longitude coordinates below) may be seen in a map by clicking on "Map of all coordinates". One site, the Newtown Battlefield, is further designated a National Historic Landmark.



Listings county-wide

|}

See also

National Register of Historic Places listings in New York

References

External links
 Chemung County, New York, listing, at National Register of Historic Places.Com
 Chemung Valley History Museum

Chemung County
Chemung County, New York